R. Narayanaswamy is a Professor of Finance at the Indian Institute of Management Bangalore, or IIMB. He teaches financial accounting and financial statement analysis.

Education  
Narayanaswamy received a Bachelors in Commerce from the University of Madras, subsequently becoming a chartered accountant. He is an Associate Chartered Accountant (ACA) of Institute of Chartered Accountants of India (ICAI), and an Associate Member (AICWA) of Institute of Cost and Works Accountants of India (ICWAI) and the Institute of Company Secretaries of India (ICSI). He obtained his Ph.D. in accounting from University of New South Wales, Sydney.

Career

Academic positions
He joined IIMB as an assistant professor in 1986. In 2006, Business Today listed him among the best nine business school professors in India. He is currently a senior Professor at IIMB in the area of Finance and Control. He is a visiting fellow at Manchester Business School, United Kingdom, and a visiting professor at Osaka University, Japan.

Books
Narayanaswamy is the author of two books on the syllabus of many renowned business schools: 
 Financial Accounting: A Managerial Perspective, PHI Learning www.phindia.com (Fifth Edition, 2014).
 Financial Reporting Asia Pacific: Financial Reporting in India, CCH Asia Pte Limited, Singapore.

References

Academic staff of the Indian Institute of Management Bangalore
Living people
Year of birth missing (living people)